Sir John Gilmour, 4th Baronet DL (15 July 1944 – 10 February 2013) was a British military officer who served in the Fife and Forfar Yeomanry/Scottish Horse. He was the son of Sir John Edward Gilmour of Lundin and Montrave, 3rd Bt. and Ursula Mabyn Wills.

Education 
Gilmour was educated at Eton College in Berkshire and the North of Scotland College of Agriculture. He was admitted to the Royal Company of Archers.

Family and public life 
Gilmour married Valerie Jardine Russell, daughter of George Walker Russell, on 6 May 1967. They lived at Wester Balcormo, Fife.
His maternal grandfather was Frank Oliver Wills the High Sheriff of Bristol, whose father was Sir Frank William Wills, the Bristol architect & Lord Mayor of Bristol, who was a member of the Wills tobacco family – WD & HO Wills. Also his 3rd great-grandfather was Seth Smith (property developer) who developed large parts of the West End of London, including Belgravia & Mayfair, in the early 1800s.

Yeomanry career 
Commissioned on 26 May 1966 as a second lieutenant into the Fife and Forfar Yeomanry/Scottish Horse, Gilmour became the fourth generation of his family to serve in this regiment.

Rising to captain, he saw the regiment turned into a cadre with its armoured vehicles removed and its pay stopped. This continued until he finished his service as a captain when his regiment was put into suspended animation. In 1992 his regiment were reactivated, and in 1999 he gained the rank of honorary colonel.

Civil appointments
Gilmour held the office of deputy lieutenant of Fife from 1988.

Titles and honours

Titles
Baronet of Lundin

Honours
Deputy lieutenant (Fife)

Honorary military appointments
Honorary Colonel of The Fife and Forfar Yeomanry/Scottish Horse Squadron of The Queen's Own Yeomanry

References

See also
Gilmour Baronets

Baronets in the Baronetage of the United Kingdom
1944 births
2013 deaths
Fife and Forfar Yeomanry/Scottish Horse officers
Deputy Lieutenants of Fife
Members of the Royal Company of Archers
People educated at Eton College
Alumni of Scotland's Rural College